Timeless Records is a jazz record label based in the Netherlands.

Timeless was founded in Wageningen in 1975 by Wim Wigt. It has specialized in bebop, though it also did a sub-series of releases of Dixieland and swing recordings. As of 2000, the label had issued some 600 albums, and had two sub-labels, World Wide Jazz and Limetree Records.

In the late 1970s, Timeless partnered with Muse Records to distribute Timeless Muse.

The label sponsored the Timeless All Stars, a six-piece ensemble founded by Wigt in 1981. The initial membership of the group was Harold Land, Curtis Fuller, Bobby Hutcherson, Cedar Walton, Buster Williams, and Billy Higgins.

Among the label's significant releases are Dizzy Gillespie Meets Phil Woods Quintet, McCoy Tyner's Bon Voyage, Lou Donaldson's Forgotten Man and albums by the George Adams-Don Pullen Quartet.

Timeless Historical is a sub-label of Timeless Records that contain CDs dedicated to early jazz. The series started in 1991 under executive production of Chris Barber and Wim Wigt with the disc of early recordings by New Orleans trumpet pioneer Sharkey Bonano. From that time they issued a total of 86 discs.

Discography

Timeless Records discography

Timeless Historical discography
 Sharkey Bonano (1928–1937) CBC1-001, 1991 (audio restoration by John R. T. Davis)
 Tempo King (1936–1937) CBC1-002, 1991 (audio restoration by John R. T. Davis )
 Fletcher Henderson and Louis Armstrong (1924–1925) CBC1-003
 Bing Crosby (1926–1932) CBC1-004
 Hot British Dance Bands (1925–1937) CBC1-005, 1991 (audio restoration by John R, liner notes Brian Rust)
 Coleman Hawkins (1934–1939) CBC-1006, 1992 (audio restoration by John R. T. Davis )
 Ethel Waters (1929–1939) CBC1-007
 Dick Robertson and Orchestra (1937–1939) CBC1-008, 1992 (audio restoration by John R. T. Davis, liner notes Brian Rust )
 Original Dixieland Band (1917–1921) CBC1-009, 1992 (audio restoration by John R. T. Davis, liner notes Brian Rust )
 Harlem Big Bands (1925–1931) CBC1-010, 1994 (audio restoration by John R. T. Davis, liner notes Richard B.Hadlock )
 Hoagy Carmichael (1927–1939) CBC-1011
 Willie the Lion Smith (1935–1937) CBC1-012, 1993 (audio restoration by John R. T. Davis, liner notes Keith Nichols )
 Bix Beiderbecke (1924–1925) CBC1-013
 New Orleans in the '20s CBC1-014, 1993 (audio restoration by John R. T. Davis, liner notes Richard M. Sudhalter)
 Johnny Dodds and Jimmy Blythe (1926–1928) CBC1-015, 1993 (audio restoration by John R. T. Davis, liner notes Pim Gras)
 Teddy Grace (1937–1940) CBC1-016, 1993 (audio restoration by John R. T. Davis, liner notes David W. McCain)
 Goofus Five (1926–1927) CBC1-017, 1994 (audio restoration by John R. T. Davis, liner notes Brian Rust)
 Mound City Blue Blowers (1935–1936) CBC1-018, 1994 (audio restoration by John R. T. Davis, liner notes Brian Rust)
 Red McKenzie (1935–1936) CBC1-019, 1994 (audio restoration by John R. T. Davis, liner notes Digby Fairweather)
 Jazz Goes to the Movies (1930–1940) CBC1-020
 Jazz from the Windy City (1927–1930) CBC1-021
 Tiny Parham (1928–1930) CBC1-022, 1996 (audio restoration by John R. T. Davis, liner notes Brian Rust)
 Putney Dandridge (1935–1936) CBC1-023
 Eddie Condon CBC1-024, 1995 (audio restoration by John R. T. Davis, liner notes Richard M. Sudhalter)
 Charlie Shavers and the Blues Singers (1938–1939) CBC1-025
 The '30s Girls CBC1-026, 1995 (audio restoration by John R. T. Davis, liner notes Sally-Ann Worsford)
 The Compositions of Jelly Roll Morton CBC1-027
 Young Sidney Bechet CBC1-028
 Cotton Pickers CBC1-029
 Big Charlie Thomas CBC1-030, 1996 (audio restoration by John R. T. Davis, liner notes John R. T. Davis)
 Georgia Melodians CBC1-031
 Boyd Senter CBC1-032, 1996 (audio restoration by John R. T. Davis, liner notes Brian Rust)
 Jazz in Texas CBC1-033, 1996 (audio restoration by John R. T. Davis, liner notes Brian Rust)
 Jazz in California CBC1-034, 1997 (audio restoration by John R. T. Davis, liner notes Brian Rust)
 Ragtime to Jazz Vol.1 CBC1-035, 1997 (audio restoration by John R. T. Davis, liner notes Brian Rust)
 Jazz in St. Louis CBC1-036, 1997 (audio restoration by John R. T. Davis, liner notes Brian Rust)
 Little Ramblers, The CBC1-037, 1997 (audio restoration by John R. T. Davis, liner notes Hans Eekhoff)
 Jazz from Atlanta CBC1-038, 1997 (audio restoration by John R. T. Davis, liner notes Hans Eekhoff)
 Ruben Reeves – The Complete Vocalions CBC1-039
 Charleston Chasers Vol. 1 (1925–1930) CBC1-040, 1999 (audio restoration by John R. T. Davis, liner notes Hans Eekhoff)
 The Benson Orchestra of Chicago - The Chicago Hot Bands CBC1-041
 Goofus Five (1924–1925) CBC1-042, 2000 (audio restoration by John R. T. Davis, liner notes Marc Berresford)
 Eddie Lang – The Quintessential Eddie Lang CBC1-043, (audio restoration by John R. T. Davis, liner notes Sally-Ann Worsford)
 George Chisholm - Early Days CBC1-044, 1998 (audio restoration by John R. T. Davis, liner notes Campbell Burnap)
 Ragtime to Jazz Vol.2 CBC1-045, 1997 (audio restoration by John R. T. Davis, liner notes Marc Berresford)
 First Days of Jazz CBC1-046
 The Rhythm Rascals, Swing Rhythm Boys, Sid Phillips CBC1-047
 Jazz Is Where You Find It CBC1-048, 1998 (audio restoration by John R. T. Davis, liner notes Brian Rust)
 Original Memphis Five CBC1-049
 Alex Hill - Ain't It Nice? CBC1-050, 1998 (audio restoration by John R. T. Davis, liner notes Sally-Ann Worsford)
 Glenn Miller's G.I.'s in Paris CBC1-051, 1998 (audio restoration by John R. T. Davis, liner notes Tony Baldwin)
 California Ramblers (1925–1928) CBC1-053, 1999 (audio restoration by John R. T. Davis, liner notes Hans Eekhoff)
 Alex Hill – Keep a Song in Your Soul! CBC1-054, 1998 (audio restoration by John R. T. Davis, liner notes Sally-Ann Worsford)
 Brunswick/Vocalion - Odds & Bits CBC1-055, 1999 (audio restoration by John R. T. Davis, liner notes Hans Eekhoff)
 Clarence Williams & His Orchestra Vol. 1 (1933–1934) CBC1-056
 Clarence Williams & His Orchestra Vol. 2 (1933–1937) CBC1-057
 Bernie Cummins & his Orchestra (1924–1930) CBC1-058, 2000 (audio restoration by John R. T. Davis, liner notes Marc Berresford)
 Abe Lyman & his Orchestra CBC1-059, 2001 (audio restoration by John R. T. Davis, liner notes by Ate van Delden)
 Bands of Vic Meyers (1923–1929) Vick Myers (1925–1926) CBC1-060, 2000 (audio restoration by Hans Eekhoff, liner notes Ate van Delden)
 Fred Elizalde – Jazz In California CBC1-061, 2000 (audio restoration by Hans Eekhoff, liner notes Ate van Delden)
 Varsity Eight CBC1-062, 2000 (audio restoration by Hans Eeekhoff, liner notes Ate van Delden)
 Those Fabulous Gennetts Vol. 1 (1923–1925) CBC1-063, 2000 (audio restoration by Hans Eekhoff, liner notes Ate van Delden)
 Fletcher Henderson – The Harmony & Vocalion Sessions (1925–1927) CBC1-064, 2000 (audio restoration by John R. T. Davis, liner notes Marc Berresford)
 Benny Goodman – (1931–1935) CBC1065, 2000 (audio restoration by John R. T. Davis, liner notes Tony Russell)
 Ray Miller and His Brunswick Orchestra (1924–1929) CBC1-066
 Isham Jones and His Orchestra (1922–1926) CBC1-067
 Tight Women & Loose Bands (1921–1931) CBC1-068
 Fletcher Henderson – The Harmony & Vocalion Sessions (1927–1928) Vol. 2 CBC1-069, 2001 (audio restoration by John R. T. Davis, liner notes Marc Berresford)
 From Ragtime to Jazz – Vol. 3 (1902–1923) CBC1-070
 Early Chicago Jazz Vol. 1 (1923–1925) CBC1-071, 2002 (audio restoration by Hans Eekhoff, liner notes Ate van Delden)
 Early Victor Electric Hot Dance Bands CBC1-072, 2004 (audio restoration by John R. T. Davis, liner notes Marc Berresford)
 Perry Bradford – "A Panorama" (1923–1927) CBC1-073, 2005 (audio restoration by John R. T. Davis, liner notes Marc Berresford)
 Ted Lewis & HIS BAND 1929-1934 CBC1-074, 2002 (audio restoration by John R. T. Davis, liner notes Marc Berresford)
 Early Chicago Jazz Vol. 2 (1923–1928) CBC1-076, 2002 (audio restoration by Hans Eekhoff, liner notes Ate van Delden)
 The Complete Ladd's Black Aces 1921–1924 CBC1-077, 2003 (audio restoration by John R. T. Davis, liner notes Marc Berresford)
 Jazz on America's West Coast 1924–1930 CBC1-078, 2003 (audio restoration by Hans Eekhoff, liner notes Ate van Delden)
 The Herb Wiedoeft/Jesse Stafford Orchestra 1922–1930 CBC1-079, 2002 (audio restoration by Hans Eekhoff, liner notes Ate van Delden)
 Those Fabulous Gennetts Vol. 2 (1922–1925) CBC1-080, 2000 (audio restoration by Hans Eekhoff, liner notes Ate van Delden)
 Charleston Chasers Vol. 2 (1928–1930) CBC1-081, 2001 (audio restoration by John R. T. Davis, liner notes Ate van Delden)
 Jean Goldkette 1924–1929 CBC1-084
 From Ragtime to Jazz – Vol.4 (1896–1922) CBC1-085
 Americans in Holland CBC1-086
 Roll Up the Carpets – "Everybody Dance" CBC1-087
 The Young Benny Goodman 1928–1931 CBC1-088, 2005 (audio restoration by Hans Eekhoff, liner notes Ate van Delden)
 Ben Selvin 1924–1926 CBC1-089, 2005 (audio restoration by Hans Eekhoff, liner notes Ate van Delden)
 Adrian Rollini and the Golden Gate Orchestra 1924–1927 CBC1-090
 Pathé & Cameo Jazzbands 1921–1928 CBC1-091, 2007 (audio restoration by Hans Eekhoff, liner notes Ate van Delden)
 Paul Whiteman 1920–1927 CBC1-093
 Americans in Holland Vol. 2 CBC1-095

References

External links
Discogs

Dutch record labels
Jazz record labels
IFPI members